The Olmec heartland is the southern portion of Mexico's Gulf Coast region between the Tuxtla mountains and the Olmec archaeological site of La Venta, extending roughly 80 km (50 mi) inland from the Gulf of Mexico coastline at its deepest.  It is today, as it was during the height of the Olmec civilization, a tropical lowland forest environment, crossed by meandering rivers.

Most researchers consider the Olmec heartland to be the home of the Olmec culture which became widespread over Mesoamerica from 1400 BCE until roughly 400 BCE.  The area is also referred to as Olman or the Olmec Metropolitan Zone.

The major heartland sites are:
San Lorenzo Tenochtitlán
La Venta 
Tres Zapotes 
Laguna de los Cerros - the least researched and least important of the major sites.

Smaller sites include:
El Manatí, an Olmec sacrificial bog.
El Azuzul, on the southern edge of the San Lorenzo area.
San Andrés, near La Venta.

Important heartland finds not associated with any archaeological site include:
"The Wrestler", a basalt statue found at Arroyo Sonso (see photo).  
Las Limas Monument 1, found by two children looking for somewhere to crack nuts.  
San Martín Pajapan Monument 1, found high on the slopes of San Martin Pajapan.

See also
Olmec influences on Mesoamerican cultures
List of archaeological sites in Veracruz

References

Literature
 (1989). "The Olmec Heartland: Evolution of Ideology" in Robert J. Sharer and David Grove (eds.), Regional Perspectives on the Olmec. Cambridge University Press. .
 (2004). The Olmecs: America's First Civilization. Thames & Hudson, London. .
 (1984). The Art and Architecture of Ancient America: The Mexican, Maya and Andean Peoples. Pelican History of Art, Yale University Press. .

Notes

Olmec Heartland
Geography of Mesoamerica